The British Academy Television Awards (BAFTA TV Awards) were first presented in 1954. They are the UK equivalent to the Emmy Awards in the United States. From 1954 to 1997, film and television awards were presented at one ceremony. Since 1998, two separate ceremonies have been held.

The awards for Best Supporting Actress and Best Supporting Actor were first presented at the 2010 ceremony.

Winners and nominees

2010s

2020s

Superlatives

Actresses with multiple wins and nominations

Multiple nominations 
The following people have been nominated for the British Academy Television Award for Best Supporting Actress multiple times:

2 nominations
 Helena Bonham Carter
 Monica Dolan
 Vanessa Kirby
 Sarah Lancashire
 Sophie Okonedo
 Lauren Socha
 Imelda Staunton
 Nicola Walker

Programmes with multiple wins and nominations

Multiple nominations 

4 nominations
 The Crown
 Last Tango in Halifax

2 nominations
 The Road to Coronation Street

References 

Supporting Actress
 
Television awards for Best Supporting Actress